The 2016–17 Continental Cup was the 20th edition of the IIHF Continental Cup, Europe's second-tier ice hockey club competition organised by International Ice Hockey Federation. The season started on 30 September 2016 and the final tournament was played on 13–15 January 2017.

Qualified teams

First round

Group A
The Group A tournament was played in Sofia, Bulgaria from 30 September – 2 October 2016 with all games held at the Winter Sports Palace. Zeytinburnu Belediyespor won the tournament, the first time for a Turkish team, and advanced to Group B in the Second round.All times are local. (EEST – UTC+3)

Second round

Group B
The Group B tournament was played in Jaca, Spain from 21–23 October 2016 with all games held at the Pabellón de Hielo.

All times are local. (CEST – UTC+2)

Group C
The Group C tournament was played in Tychy, Poland from 21–23 October 2016 with all games held at the Winter Stadium.

All times are local. (CEST – UTC+2)

Third round

Group D
The Group D tournament was played in Odense, Denmark from 18–20 November 2016 with all games held at the Odense Isstadion.

All times are local. (CET – UTC+1)

Group E
The Group E tournament was played in Ritten, Italy from 18–20 November 2016 with all games held at the Arena Ritten.

All times are local. (CET – UTC+1)

Final round
Continental Cup Final tournament was played in Ritten, Italy from 13–15 January 2017 with all games held at the Arena Ritten.All times are local. (CET – UTC+1)

See also

 2016–17 Champions Hockey League

References

External links
 Official IIHF tournament page

IIHF Continental Cup
2016–17 in European ice hockey